Gabriel Georges Coury VC (13 June 1896 – 2 February 1956), was an English recipient of the Victoria Cross, the highest and most prestigious award for gallantry in the face of the enemy that can be awarded to British and Commonwealth forces.

Early years

Born on 13 June 1896 in Liverpool, Lancashire, to Lebanese parents, Coury was educated at Stonyhurst College from 1907 to 1913. He worked as an apprentice in a cotton brokerage when World War I broke out. Coury volunteered to join Kitchener's New Army in 1914.

Victoria Cross

While Coury was a second lieutenant in the 3rd Battalion, The South Lancashire Regiment (The Prince of Wales's Volunteers) (attached to the 1/4th Battalion, South Lancashire Regiment, the pioneer battalion of the 55th (West Lancashire) Division), he performed deeds on 8 August 1916, near Arrow Head Copse, France, for which he was awarded the VC. His actions also earned him a promotion to full lieutenant.

Citation

Royal Flying Corps
On 15 November 1916, Coury was seconded to the Royal Flying Corps as a flying officer (observer). He was appointed a flying officer on 20 September 1917, although his seniority was dated from 28 August 1917.

On 1 April 1918, Coury was transferred to the Royal Air Force on its establishment, and he subsequently transferred to the RAF Administrative Branch on 20 September 1918. On 30 September 1918, Coury was promoted to temporary captain in the Medical section of the Administrative Branch. He mustered out as a captain when the war ended.

Post war
After the war, Coury returned to his old firm as a cotton broker. When the Second World War broke out, he joined the Royal Army Service Corps and participated in the Normandy Landings.

Legacy
Coury is honoured in a memorial at his former school, St Francis Xavier's College, Liverpool. His VC is on display at the Queen's Lancashire Regiment Museum at Fulwood Barracks in Preston, Lancashire.

References

Monuments to Courage (David Harvey, 1999)
The Register of the Victoria Cross (This England, 1997)
VCs of the First World War - The Somme (Gerald Gliddon, 1994)
Liverpool VCs (James Murphy, Pen and Sword Books, 2008)

External links

1896 births
1956 deaths
People educated at Stonyhurst College
South Lancashire Regiment officers
Royal Flying Corps officers
British Battle of the Somme recipients of the Victoria Cross
Royal Air Force officers
British Army personnel of World War I
Royal Air Force personnel of World War I
Royal Army Service Corps officers
British Army personnel of World War II
English people of Lebanese descent
Victoria Cross awardees from Liverpool
British Army recipients of the Victoria Cross
Burials in Merseyside